The 1827 Land Lottery was the fifth lottery of the Georgia Land Lotteries, a lottery system used by the U.S. state of Georgia between the years 1805 and 1833 to redistribute stolen Cherokee and Muscogee land to white settlers. The 1827 lottery was authorized by the Georgia General Assembly by an act of June 9, 1825. The lottery redistributed confiscated Muscogee land in Carroll, Coweta, Lee, Muscogeee, and Troup counties. 

The lots were 202.5 acres in size. Registration for the lottery occurred in the two months after the Act's publication on December 7, 1824, with drawings occurring in 1827. Fortunate drawers from the previous Georgia land lotteries were excluded, as well as draft resisters who refused to fight in the War of 1812 or the Indian Wars, people who deserted from military service, imprisoned convicts, tax defaulters, and absconders for debt.

See also
Georgia Land Lotteries
1805 Land Lottery
1807 Land Lottery
1820 Land Lottery
1821 Land Lottery
1832 Land Lottery
Gold Lottery of 1832
1833 Fractions Lottery
Georgia resolutions 1827
Indian removal

References

External links
Georgia Land Lottery Records Research Guide, Random Acts of Genealogical Kindness

1827 in Georgia (U.S. state)
Georgia Land Lotteries
Government of Georgia (U.S. state)
History of Georgia (U.S. state)
Muscogee
Lotteries in the United States